High Tide is a 1947 American film noir directed by John Reinhardt.  The film features Lee Tracy, Don Castle and Julie Bishop.

Plot
The editor of a newspaper hires a former employee-turned-private-investigator to protect him during an ongoing power struggle. The private eye discovers the truth and the two men end up in a precarious situation after the editor's actions catch up with him and his plans backfire.

Cast
 Lee Tracy as Hugh Fresney
 Don Castle as Tim 'T.M.' Slade
 Julie Bishop as Julie Vaughn
 Anabel Shaw as Dana Jones
 Douglas Walton as Clinton Vaughn
 Regis Toomey as Inspector O'Haffey
 Francis Ford as Pop Garrow
 Anthony Warde as Nick Dyke
 Argentina Brunetti as Mrs. Cresser
 Wilson Wood as Cleve Collins
 George Ryland as Doctor at Shooting Scene

Film restoration
In 2013 the UCLA Film and Television Archive, funded by the Film Noir Foundation, restored the film. The restored print was screened April 13, 2013, at the American Cinematheque's "Noir City: Hollywood" festival.

References

External links
 
 
 
 

1947 films
1947 crime films
American crime films
American black-and-white films
Film noir
Films set in Los Angeles
Films about journalists
Monogram Pictures films
1940s English-language films
1940s American films